In enzymology, a cysteine-S-conjugate N-acetyltransferase is an enzyme that catalyzes the chemical reaction

acetyl-CoA + an S-substituted L-cysteine  CoA + an S-substituted N-acetyl-L-cysteine

Thus, the two substrates of this enzyme are acetyl-CoA and S-substituted L-cysteine, whereas its two products are CoA and S-substituted N-acetyl-L-cysteine.

This enzyme belongs to the family of transferases, specifically those acyltransferases transferring groups other than aminoacyl groups.  The systematic name of this enzyme class is acetyl-CoA:S-substituted L-cysteine N-acetyltransferase. This enzyme participates in glutathione metabolism.

References

 

EC 2.3.1
Enzymes of unknown structure